The 2020 Women's South American Volleyball Club Championship is the 12th official edition of the Women's South American Volleyball Club Championship, played by five teams from February, 17 to February 21, 2020, in Uberlândia, Brazil.

Minas Tênis Clube won its third consecutive and overall title, and qualified for the 2020 FIVB Volleyball Women's Club World Championship.

Pools composition

Round-robin pool
All times are Brasília Time (UTC−03:00).

|}

|}

Final standing

All-Star team
The following players were chosen for the tournament's "All-Star team":

Most Valuable Player
 Thaisa Menezes (Minas Tênis Clube)
Best Opposite
 Brayelin Martínez (Praia Clube)
Best Outside Hitters
 Dobriana Rabadzhieva (Minas Tênis Clube)
 Daniela Bulaich (San Lorenzo)

Best Setter
 Macris Carneiro (Minas Tênis Clube)
Best Middle Blockers
 Caroline Gattaz (Minas Tênis Clube)
 Ana Carolina da Silva (Praia Clube)
Best Libero
 Léia Silva (Minas Tênis Clube)

See also

2020 Men's South American Volleyball Club Championship

References

External links
CSV

Volleyball
Women's South American Volleyball Club Championship
Volleyball
Women's South American Volleyball Club Championship
Sport in Minas Gerais
Women's South American Volleyball Club Championship